The Caudron C.23 was a French long range twin engine night bomber, flown in the last year of World War I. Post-war some machines were modified to carry passengers.

Design and development

The C.23 BN.2 was designed to be a night bomber able to reach Berlin with a  bomb load. The French BN.2 military category indicated a two-seat night bomber but the C.23 had a crew of three. It had much in common with the Caudron C.22 but was almost 50% larger in span, requiring an extra bay and more powerful engines. It was a large five bay biplane, with fabric covered, constant chord, unswept wings with angled tips. The upper wing, which carried the ailerons, had a slightly greater (4%) span and a smaller chord. There was no stagger, so the sets of parallel interplane struts were vertical; flying wires braced each bay. Pairs of V-form engine bearing struts, which supported the two neatly cowled  Salmson 9Z nine cylinder water-cooled radial engines just above the lower wing, defined the inner two bays.

The C.23 had a flat sided fuselage.  There was a gunner's position in the nose, equipped with twin Lewis guns. A roomy open cockpit was positioned under the wing leading edge, with a separate gunner's cockpit behind it under a large, rounded trailing edge cut-out. This was fitted with another pair of Lewis guns and a further gun firing downwards through a trapdoor in the floor. A low, broad fin carried a broad balanced rudder which extended down to the keel. The tailplane, angular in plan and of very low aspect ratio, was mounted on top of the fuselage and its elevators had cut-outs for rudder movement.

The bomber had a fixed tailskid undercarriage, with mainwheels in pairs, their axles mounted on longitudinal bars attached to the wing, under the engines, by N-form struts.

The Caudron C.23 first flew in February 1918, piloted by Jules Védrines. Higher power engines, the  Salmson 18Z or the  Hispano-Suiza 8Fb, were considered in April 1918 but the Salmson was not yet fully developed and trials with the Hispano led nowhere.

Operational history

By the time of the Armistice in November 1918 fifty-four C.23s had  been delivered to the French Air Force. Some served with the 22nd squadron until their replacement by the more powerful Farman Goliath in February 1920.

Very soon after the war some C.23s were modified to carry twelve passengers in an open cockpit formed by an opening between the cockpit and mid-upper gunner's position. On 10 February 1919 one made the first passenger flight between Paris and Brussels, carrying five passengers tightly packed together. One C.23, designated C.23 bis, was modified to carry fifteen passengers internally.

Jules Védrines and his engineer Guillian were killed in a C.23 when an engine failed whilst trying to establish a route from Paris to Rome.

Variants

C.23 BN.2 bomber
C.23 12 seat transport
C.23 bis 15 seat cabin transport

Operators

French Air Force - 22nd squadron.

Specifications (C.23 BN.2)

References

C.023
1910s French bomber aircraft
1910s French airliners
Aircraft first flown in 1918
Biplanes